Mogallu is a village in Palakoderu mandal, located  from Bhimavaram Town in West Godavari district, Andhra Pradesh, India

Demographics
According to Indian census, 2011, the demographic details of Mogallu Village is as follows:
 No of Households: 2041
 Persons: 7102
 Males: 3,517
 Females: 3,585

Notable people born in the village
Freedom Fighter Alluri Sitarama Raju and 
Eminent Scientist Ayyagari Sambasiva Rao
Prominent karanam and social worker - Ayyagari Visweswara Rao

References

 
 http://www.censusindia.gov.in/PopulationFinder/Sub_Districts_Master.aspx?state_code=28&district_code=15
 http://www.censusindia.gov.in/2011census/MDDS/mdds_dir_Rural_28.pdf

Villages in West Godavari district